S114 is a road in Amsterdam, Netherlands.

See also

References

City routes in Amsterdam